South Woodstock is a village and census-designated place (CDP) in Woodstock, Windham County, Connecticut, United States. The population was 1,291 at the 2010 census.

It is notable as the former home of the now-defunct Annhurst College.

Geography

Demographics
As of the census of 2000, there were 1,211 people, 499 households, and 333 families residing in the CDP. The racial makeup of the CDP was 97.19% White, 0.08% African American, 0.08% Native American, 0.58% Asian, 0.17% from other races, and 1.90% from two or more races. Hispanic or Latino of any race were 0.91% of the population.

There were 499 households, out of which 30.7% had children under the age of 18 living with them, 54.7% were married couples living together, 8.2% had a female householder with no husband present, and 33.1% were non-families. 26.3% of all households were made up of individuals, and 10.2% had someone living alone who was 65 years of age or older.  The average household size was 2.43 and the average family size was 2.95.

In the CDP the population was spread out, with 25.0% under the age of 18, 7.8% from 18 to 24, 31.4% from 25 to 44, 22.8% from 45 to 64, and 13.0% who were 65 years of age or older.  The median age was 38 years. For every 100 females, there were 101.5 males.  For every 100 females age 18 and over, there were 93.2 males.

The median income for a household in the CDP was $37,458, and the median income for a family was $44,821. Males had a median income of $38,083 versus $26,140 for females. The per capita income for the CDP was $21,239.  None of the families and 3.5% of the population were living below the poverty line, including no under eighteens and 9.9% of those over 64.

References

Woodstock, Connecticut
Census-designated places in Windham County, Connecticut
Villages in Connecticut